Yegor Vladimirovich Nikolayev (born February 12, 1988) is a Russian runner who specializes in various middle-distance and long-distance events. He represented Russia at the 2012 Summer Olympics in the 1500 m.

Nikolayev finished the 3000 metres in second overall at the 2011 European Team Championships Super League. At the 2012 Summer Olympics, Nikolayev qualified for the semifinal round of the men's 1500 metres, where he recorded a personal best time of 3:37.28. On January 8, 2014, he ran 7:51.96 in the indoor 3000 meters at the 23rd Yamalov Memorial indoor track meet in Yekaterinburg.

International competitions

References

External links

1988 births
Living people
Sportspeople from Yekaterinburg
Russian male middle-distance runners
Russian male long-distance runners
Olympic male middle-distance runners
Olympic athletes of Russia
Athletes (track and field) at the 2012 Summer Olympics
European Games competitors for Russia
Athletes (track and field) at the 2019 European Games
Competitors at the 2013 Summer Universiade
Competitors at the 2015 Summer Universiade
Russian Athletics Championships winners